Doce casas, historia de mujeres devotas is a 2014 Argentine miniseries written and directed by Santiago Loza. A new fiction series produced by TV Pública and co-produced with Vasko Films, with the performance of great Argentine actresses of all generations. Its first broadcast was on March 31, 2014 which is broadcast from Monday to Thursday at 10:30 p.m. (UTC-3) on TV Pública.

Cast 
 1st week - January. Story of Lidia and Ester: 
 Marilú Marini as Lidia 
 Claudia Lapacó as Ester
 Claudio Tolcachir as Damián

 2nd week - February. Mercedes story:
 Rita Cortese as Mercedes
 María Inés Sancerni as Norma
 Patricio Aramburu as Esteban
 José Escobar as Mario

 3rd week - March. Teresa's Story:
 Eva Bianco as Teresa
 Viviana Saccone as Gloria
 Marcelo Subiotto as Ricardo
 Guillermo Arengo as Julio

 4th week - April. Magdalena's Story:
 María Marull as Magdalena
 Julia Calvo as Marta
 Martín Gross as Ramón

 5th week - May. Aurora's son's story:
 Iván Moschner as Dalmiro
 Verónica Llinás as Estela

 6th week - June. Dora and Marina's Story:
 Susú Pecoraro as Dora
 Julieta Zylberberg as Marina

 7th week - July. Andrea's Story:
 Cecilia Ursi as Andrea 
 Ailín Salas as Josefina 
 Alejandra Flechner as Mirtha
 Martín Slipak as Pedro

 8th week - August. Teté's Story:
 Tina Serrano as Teté
 Cristina Banegas as Rita 
 Leonor Manso as Nélida

 9th week - September. Story of Delia and Omar:
 María Onetto as Delia
 Juan Gabriel Miño as Omar
 Gaby Ferrero as Omar's mom
 Boy Olmi as Octavio

 10th week - October. Romeo story:
 Alejandro Tantanian as Romeo
 Marco Antonio Caponi as Adolfo 
 Cecilia Rosetto as Valeria 
 Cecilia Rainero as María Dolores "Dolo"

 11th week - November. Nora's Story:
 Laura Paredes as Nora
 Luisina Brando as Adela
 Esteban Meloni as Juan

 12th week - December. Lili's Story:
 Ingrid Pelicori as Ana
 Noemí Frenkel as Amalia 
 Luz Palazón as Azucena
 Emilio Bardi as Norberto

Awards and nominations 

2010s Argentine drama television series
2010s anthology television series
Televisión Pública original programming
2014 Argentine television series debuts
2014 Argentine television series endings
Spanish-language television shows